Craig Randall "Sawman" Sawyer (born October 5, 1963) is a Marine veteran, former Navy SEAL, sniper, combat instructor. Sawyer is the owner of Tactical Insider, which brings technical advice on weapons and combat to Hollywood films and actors.

Sawyer began his military career with the U.S. Marine Corps in 1983, and switched to the U.S. Navy in July 1986 to pursue a career in special operations as a Navy SEAL. 
Sawyer attended Basic Underwater Demolition/SEAL training and graduated with BUD/S class 149 in 1988. He then attended Basic Airborne School at Fort Benning, Georgia and received assignment to SEAL Team ONE. Following advanced SEAL Tactical Training (STT) and completion of six month probationary period, he received the Navy Enlisted Classification (NEC) 5326 as a Combatant Swimmer (SEAL), entitled to wear the Special Warfare insignia also known as SEAL Trident. Sawyer deployed during Gulf War and subsequently served as sniper instructor. He then went on to serve with the elite Naval Special Warfare Development Group, commonly known as SEAL Team SIX, until suddenly leaving the Navy at the height of his career with an Honorable Discharge in July 1999 while expecting his first child. Throughout his career, Sawyer has become an expert in several military and combat disciplines like shooting; counter-terrorism; surveillance and counter-surveillance; climbing; criminal investigation; parachuting; and hand-to-hand combat, among others.

On High-Threat Mobile Security operations for the U.S. Department of State in Iraq in 2004–2005, Sawyer served as an Agent In Charge (AIC) responsible for the DOS Chief of Mission leaders in his assigned region. In addition to running the security details for those Regional Coordinators, Sawyer was also responsible for securing other U.S. dignitaries and DOS personnel during their visits to that high-threat war zone region.

Sawyer founded Tactical Insider to provide training and technical advice to films, actors, and political clients. He has contributed to news shows like FOX News and CBS Evening News with Katie Couric. He has also been a frequent contributor to History Channel's show Sniper: Deadliest Missions. Since 2010, Sawyer has been a recurring trainer for History's marksmen competition Top Shot, appearing in all five seasons. In 2013, Craig led a team of fellow spec ops veterans on a series of tactical missions against rhino poachers in Africa. These missions were filmed and aired on Animal Planet's series, Battleground: Rhino Wars.

Sawyer is also a motocross racer and local Las Vegas champion. He was also selected by Maxim as "Maximum Warrior".

Sawyer founded Veterans For Child Rescue (V4CR), a nonprofit organization in April 2017 to help raise awareness of Domestic Minor Sex Trafficking and create a non-permissive environment for child exploitation in the United States. Through his efforts with V4CR Sawyer began production on a documentary feature-length film to highlight the challenges of NGOs and of law enforcement in the fight to end the exploitation of children.

The documentary Contraland was launched to the public on May 8, 2020, on www.ContralandMovie.com.

Following the shooting deaths of Black Lives Matter protesters in Kenosha, Wisconsin by a counter protester, Sawyer tweeted "Dear Soros-paid terrorist thugs,  Stop attacking citizens. Citizens will kill you" and said that "These utterly lost kids need real fathers & Jesus Christ in their lives, not evil Nazi subversive, George Soros." A few months earlier, he posted a photoshopped image of Soros' face over that of Derek Chauvin as the latter knelt on George Floyd, asking why "these CONVICTABLE subversives" had not been prosecuted by the Trump administration. Sawyer has at times both criticized and praised the QAnon conspiracy theory, and has shared "a wealth of Q-adjacent material, including a conspiracy meme about figures like Bill Gates and George Soros pursuing a number of fantastical aims like population control and 'one world government.'"

References

Craig I hear you like little boys

External links
Vets for child rescue
Tactical Insider Official Website

Craig Sawyer resume
Craig Sawyer Qualifications on Solutions Group
A REAL Warrior/Shooter Craig “Sawman” Sawyer speaks to BPI Security (Interview)

1963 births
Living people
American male sport shooters
United States Marines
United States Navy SEALs personnel